Aoplus defraudator is a species of wasp in the genus Aoplus. It was first identified by Constantin Wesmael, in 1845.

Distribution 
It is found in many parts of the world. It is found in Austria, Belarus, Belgium, Bulgaria, Czechoslovakia, Finland, France, Germany, Hungary, Ireland, Italy, the Netherlands, Norway, Poland, Romania, Spain and the United Kingdom.

Web of life 
Its life's web contains two partners. They are:

 Danaus (Anosia) chrysippus (Linnaeus 1758)
 Scopula floslactata (Haworth, 1809)

References 

Ichneumonidae
Insects described in 1845